Events from the year 2007 in Macau, China.

Incumbents
 Chief Executive - Edmund Ho
 President of the Legislative Assembly - Susana Chou

Events

February
 11 February - The opening of Grand Lisboa in Sé.

May
 1 May - 2007 Macau labour protest.
 12 May - The opening of Crown Macau in Taipa.

June
 10 June - 2007 Hong Kong–Macau Interport.

October
 26 October - The start of 2007 Asian Indoor Games.

November
 3 November - The end of 2007 Asian Indoor Games.

December
 18 December - The opening of MGM Grand Macau in Sé.
 20 December - 2007 Macau transfer of sovereignty anniversary protest.

References

 
Years of the 21st century in Macau
Macau
Macau
2000s in Macau